The Insurgency in Arunachal Pradesh is a part of the larger Northeast India insurgency involving multiple groups trying to separate from or destabilize the province. Because of Arunachal Pradesh's close proximity to the border, many groups are able to use border crossings to promote their terrorist activity. In addition to the non-state groups operating in the region, since its recapture in the 1962 War, there has been incursions from the Chinese Army in the region further escalating the conflict. The conflict has cooled since police arrest of major insurgent leaders. The insurgency has seen many minor actors in conflict with each other due to ethnic and religious differences.

Insurgent Groups and Activities 
The National Liberation Council of Taniland (NLCT), an ethnic separatist group, was active along the Assam – Arunachal Pradesh border. The NLCT seeks to establish a separate nation in northeast India known as Taniland for the Tani peoples. Their most recent activity was a shooting attack in the neighboring Assam province.

National Socialist Council of Nagaland is a much larger ethno-nationalist separatist group. It also seeks a separate nation for the Naga peoples known as Greater Nagaland. The government of India and the NSCN had been in negotiations since 2001 with various cease-fires declared, and were close to a peace agreement in 2015, but ultimately fell apart. They continue operations in camps in the Tirap and Changlang districts.

United Socialist Council of Arunachal was a minor communist terror organization operating in the province. It was led by Gangte Tugung until his capture by state police along with much of the USCA leadership  on August 10, 2005. Tungung had previously been arrested twice but escaped both times.

References 

20th-century conflicts
21st-century conflicts
Conflicts in 2013
Conflicts in 2014
Conflicts in 2015
Internal security issues of India
Separatism in India
Wars involving India
Wars involving Bhutan
Wars involving Myanmar
Arunachal Pradesh
Rebellions in India
Arunachal Pradesh
Proxy wars